Jeff Tidball is a game designer who has worked primarily on role-playing games.

Career
After the success of On the Edge (1994), college student Jeff Tidball became one of the new full-time employees at Atlas Games. When the collectible card game field crashed in 1996, John Nephew and Tidball were the only staff retained by Atlas. Tidball became the Director of Creative Development and soon began developing Atlas Games's next role-playing game, Ars Magica, which Atlas had acquired from Wizards of the Coast. Tidball also became the Ars Magica line developer, and the Feng Shui line developer as well. Tidball's Cults Across America (1998) was one of the board and card game releases from Atlas. In 2000, Tidball left Atlas Games for an MFA film script-writing program at the University of Southern California. Tidball was later hired by Last Unicorn Games, but by January 2004 Tidball and Jess Heinig were the only remaining employees in the Last Unicorn Games RPG division of Decipher Games, so Decipher shut down Last Unicorn Games. Tidball designed the Cthulhu 500 card game for Atlas. Tidball worked as the line developer for Decipher's The Lord of the Rings Roleplaying Game. Atlas published Pieces of Eight (2006), a game designed by Tidball using coins as a game mechanic. Will Hindmarch and Tidball later formed the small press company called Gameplaywright. Tidball subsequently worked as the senior developer and editor for the board and card game departments at Fantasy Flight Games, before returning to Atlas Games on a contract basis as chief operating officer. He has also continued to write in the roleplaying industry, notably the massive Eternal Lies campaign he wrote with Hindmarch for Pelgrane Press's Trail of Cthulhu RPG.

Tidball lives with his wife and sons in the Twin Cities area.

References

External links
 Home page
 Jeff Tidball :: Pen & Paper RPG Database archive

Atlas Games people
Living people
Role-playing game designers
Year of birth missing (living people)